This is the results breakdown of the local elections held in the Balearic Islands on 24 May 2015. The following tables show detailed results in the autonomous community's most populous municipalities, sorted alphabetically.

Opinion polls

Overall

City control
The following table lists party control in the most populous municipalities, including provincial capitals (shown in bold). Gains for a party are displayed with the cell's background shaded in that party's colour.

Municipalities

Calvià
Population: 50,363

Ciutadella de Menorca
Population: 29,282

Ibiza
Population: 49,693

Inca
Population: 30,625

Llucmajor
Population: 34,602

Manacor
Population: 40,264

Maó-Mahón
Population: 28,460

Marratxí
Population: 35,521

Palma
Population: 399,093

Sant Antoni de Portmany
Population: 23,359

Sant Josep de sa Talaia
Population: 25,362

Santa Eulària des Riu
Population: 36,189

Island Councils

See also
2015 Balearic regional election

References

Balearic Islands
2015